Phragmataecia gummata is a species of moth of the family Cossidae. It is found in China (Fukien, Lingping), Vietnam, Thailand and Indonesia (Java, Sumatra).

References

Moths described in 1892
Phragmataecia